The 1953 German Grand Prix was a Formula Two motor racing event held on 2 August 1953 at the Nürburgring Nordschleife. It was race 7 of 9 in the 1953 World Championship of Drivers, which was run to Formula Two rules in 1952 and 1953, rather than the Formula One regulations normally used. This race had the highest number of cars on the grid of any World Drivers' Championship race, with 34 starters.

This race was won by Nino Farina in a Ferrari, just over 1 minute ahead of Juan Manuel Fangio. This was Farina's last victory in Formula One.

Ferrari driver Alberto Ascari clinched his second consecutive World Drivers' Championship as neither Mike Hawthorn nor Juan Manuel Fangio won the race and now couldn't beat his points total with two races left.

During his tour of Europe that saw Japan's 19-year old Crown Prince Akihito visit the Coronation of Queen Elizabeth II, he also attended the German Grand Prix.

Classification

Qualifying

Race 

Notes
 – 1 point for fastest lap

Shared drives 
 : (Ascari and Villoresi switched cars)
 Car #1: Ascari (9 laps) then Villoresi (8 laps)
 Car #4: Villoresi (10 laps) then Ascari (5 laps)

Championship standings after the race 
Drivers' Championship standings

Note: Only the top five positions are included. Only the best 4 results counted towards the Championship. Numbers without parentheses are Championship points; numbers in parentheses are total points scored.

References

German Grand Prix
German Grand Prix
German Grand Prix
German Grand Prix